The Men's 4×100 Medley Relay at the 10th FINA World Swimming Championships (25m) was swum on 19 December 2010 in Dubai, United Arab Emirates. 21 nations swam in the Preliminary heats in the morning, from which the top-8 finishers advanced to the Final that evening.

At the start of the event, the existing World (WR) and Championship records (CR) were as follows.

The following records were established during the competition:

Results

Heats

Final

The USA won the event in a Championship Record 3:20.99, ahead of Russia at 3:21.61. Stanislav Donets lead-off the Russia relay with a 48.95, a new Championship Record for the 100 backstroke and within one-hundredth-of-a-second of the World Record. At the 100, Russia was in first place with the USA second. On the second leg (breaststroke), the USA's Alexandrov swam a 56.52, which caught-up the Russia's Lakhtyukhov, so that at the 200, the USA trailed Russia 1:46.40 to 1:46.22. During the third leg (butterfly), the USA's Lochte pulled ahead of Russia's Korotyshkin, giving the USA a slim lead over Russia, 2:35.57 to 2:35.61. For the final leg (freestyle), the USA extended its lead.

References

Medley relay 4x100 metre, Men's
World Short Course Swimming Championships